Merom may refer to:

 Merom, Indiana, a town in the United States
 Lake Merom, a former lake in the Hula Valley of Israel
 Merom Golan, a kibbutz in the Golan Heights
 Merom (microprocessor), code name for the mobile variant of the Intel Core 2 processor
 Ancient Merom, thought to be located at the site of Meiron
 Battle of the Waters of Merom in the Hebrew Bible